"Doubleback" is a song by ZZ Top from the 1990 album Recycler. It was released as a lead single and was also featured in the film Back to the Future Part III.

Back to the Future Part III
The regular version of the song plays over the end credits of the film, but does not appear in its original form on Back to the Future Part III: Original Motion Picture Soundtrack. 

The band had a cameo in the movie playing a country music version of the song along with some local musicians. This orchestral version appears on the soundtrack album.  

The music video for "Doubleback" had clips from the movie and was included on its DVD release. 

The song was also featured in the pinball game Back to the Future: The Pinball.

Reception
"Doubleback" reached No. 1 on the Album Rock Tracks for 5 weeks. It was nominated for an MTV Video Music Award in 1990 for "Best Video from a Film".

Personnel
 Billy Gibbons – guitar, lead vocals
 Dusty Hill – bass guitar, backing vocals
 Frank Beard – drums

Charts

References

1990 singles
1990 songs
ZZ Top songs
Songs written by Frank Beard (musician)
Songs written by Dusty Hill
Songs written by Billy Gibbons
Songs written for films
Music from Back to the Future (franchise)
Warner Records singles
Song recordings produced by Bill Ham